Roderick Evan Schwartz, II (born August 27, 1984) is a former American football safety. He was signed by the New Orleans Saints as an undrafted free agent in 2008. He played college football at Houston.

Schwartz was also a member of the Tennessee Titans and Hamilton Tiger-Cats. Schwartz now assists in coaching for the Pop Warner East Manatee Bulldogs in Bradenton Florida.

External links
Hamilton Tiger-Cats bio
Houston Cougars bio
Tennessee Titans bio

1984 births
Living people
People from Bradenton, Florida
American football safeties
American players of Canadian football
Canadian football linebackers
Houston Cougars football players
New Orleans Saints players
Tennessee Titans players
Hamilton Tiger-Cats players